Tadokoro (written: 田所 lit. "farmland") is a Japanese surname. Notable people with the surname include:

, Japanese voice actress and singer
, Japanese footballer
, better known as Diamond Yukai, Japanese singer and actor

Fictional characters
, a character in the manga series Yowamushi Pedal
, a character in the manga series Shokugeki no Sōma

Japanese-language surnames